Lara Carroll (born 8 December 1986), also known by her married name Lara Mist, is an English-born competition swimmer who has represented Australia in international events, including the 2004 Summer Olympics.

She attended Leeming Senior High School in the suburb of Leeming.

Carroll made her international debut at the 2004 Summer Olympics in Athens, where she finished 6th in the 200 m individual medley. She claimed her first international medals later that year at the 2004 FINA Short Course World Championships in Indianapolis, claiming silver and bronze in the 200-metre and 400-metre individual medley respectively.  She claimed her first long-course medal at the 2005 World Aquatics Championships, claiming a bronze in the 200-metre individual medley.  She also came fourth in the 400-metre event.

Carroll is a member of the Australian Commonwealth Swimming Team at the 2006 Commonwealth Games in Melbourne, where she won a bronze medal in the 200-metre individual medley, finishing behind Stephanie Rice and Brooke Hanson, in a time of 2:13.86.  She didn't compete in the 400-metre event due to illness.

She is a student and a member of the Fremantle Port swimming club.

In May 2014, she married her long-time partner Sam Mist in a ceremony at Rottnest Island.

References 

1986 births
Living people
Australian female medley swimmers
Medalists at the FINA World Swimming Championships (25 m)
Olympic swimmers of Australia
Swimmers at the 2004 Summer Olympics
World Aquatics Championships medalists in swimming
Commonwealth Games bronze medallists for Australia
Swimmers at the 2006 Commonwealth Games
Commonwealth Games medallists in swimming
21st-century Australian women
Medallists at the 2006 Commonwealth Games